Ioannis Chrysochoou (born 12 July 1934) is a Greek rower. He competed in the men's coxed pair event at the 1960 Summer Olympics.

References

1934 births
Living people
Greek male rowers
Olympic rowers of Greece
Rowers at the 1960 Summer Olympics
Sportspeople from Piraeus